Sebileau's muscle is the deep muscle fibres of the dartos tunic which pass into the scrotal septum. It is named after French anatomist Pierre Sebileau (1860–1953).

References

Muscles of the torso
Scrotum
Connective tissue